The Gift of Life Marrow Registry is a public bone marrow and blood stem cell registry headquartered in Boca Raton, Florida. Gift of Life facilitates transplants for children and adults suffering from life-threatening illnesses, including leukemia, lymphoma, other cancers and genetic diseases.

Gift of Life is a non-profit organization. Although it operates a public resource available to patients globally, it does not receive government funding.

History
Gift of Life was founded following a successful bone marrow registration drive to save the life of Jay Feinberg, a 22-year-old analyst with the Federal Reserve.

Feinberg was diagnosed with leukemia in 1991. Since tissue type is inherited, like eye or hair color, a patient's best chance of finding a genetic match lies with those of similar ethnic background. For Feinberg, those were donors of Eastern European Jewish descent. After four years of searching for, a match was found with a 16 year-old girl from Illinois, saving Feinberg's life.

At that time, the worldwide registry was not representative of all ethnic groups. Feinberg felt an urgent need to add diversity to the registry, creating the Gift of Life registry.

Background 
Only 30 percent of patients with diseases treatable with a bone marrow transplant can find a suitable donor among their family members. The remaining 70 percent must rely on the generosity of an unrelated donor to save their lives. There are more than 90 marrow and stem cell donor registries in 56 countries.

Gift of Life was the first registry in the world to human leukocyte antigen tissue type bone marrow donors on a mass scale at donor drives using buccal swabs.

Since its inception in 1991, Gift of Life has found 23,370 matches and facilitated more than 4,290 bone marrow transplants. More than 410,000 donors are currently registered with Gift of Life.

Collection
Bone Marrow: Marrow is found in the hollow cavities of the body's large bones. Donation involves withdrawing 2-3 percent of the donor's total marrow from the iliac crest of the hip, posterior aspect of the donor's pelvic bone. There is no cutting or stitching. The procedure involves a needle aspiration, performed using an anesthetic. Typically, the donor enters a medical center’s outpatient facility in the morning and goes home in the afternoon. Today, bone marrow is requested approximately 10 percent of the time.

Peripheral Blood Stem Cells (PBSC): It is possible to collect stem cells from the peripheral blood rather than the bone marrow. In order to collect a sufficient quantity of stem cells, injections of a medication called filgrastim must be administered. This mobilizes stem cells to travel from the bone marrow into the circulating blood. The stem cells are collected through a procedure called apheresis, the same process used to collect several other types of blood components.  A cell separating machine filters out the stem cells, which can then be infused into the recipient. Today, PBSC is requested approximately 90 percent of the time.

There are clinical reasons why one cellular source may be more beneficial for the patient over the other. The transplant physician requests one source based on the patient's circumstances. If a donor declines to donate via one method, the transplant center may or may not be able to accept the other, based on the clinical needs of the patient.

Gift of Life – Be the Match Collection Center
In April 2019, Gift of Life opened the Dr. Miriam and Sheldon G. Adelson Gift of Life - Be the Match Collection Center in collaboration with the Be The Match Registry at its Florida headquarters. The Collection Center primarily collects blood stem cells from donors for transplant into a patient. The stem cells are taken by a courier to the patient’s transplant center.

Center for Cell and Gene Therapy
Gift of Life opened a Center for Cell and Gene Therapy at its Boca Raton location in November 2020. The facility houses a Cellular Therapy Laboratory and BioBank. High complexity testing (hematology and flow cytometry), processing (Sepax 2) and cryopreservation are performed at this location.

Other United States Registries
The National Marrow Donor Program (NMDP) is a nonprofit organization founded in 1986 and based in Minneapolis, that operates the Be The Match Registry of volunteer donors and cord blood units. In May 2004, the Gift of Life Marrow Registry and the NMDP formed an associate donor registry relationship together.

DKMS, a German bone marrow registry, also operates a large US bone marrow registry.

References

Further reading
 
 
 
 
 
 
 "Saving a Life is Easier Than You Think". The Huffington Post. May 19, 2015.
 "Equal Opportunity for Those Needing Bone Marrow Transplants". The Huffington Post. March 22, 2016.

External links
 
 World Marrow Donor Association
 World Marrow Donor Day

Non-profit organizations based in Florida
Transplant organizations
Health charities in the United States
Medical and health organizations based in Florida